Take Off is an oil on canvas painting by English artist Laura Knight, created in 1943. It is one of the several works that she made when she was one of the British official war artists during World War II. It is held at the Imperial War Museum, in London.

Description
The painting depicts the interior of a British Short Stirling bomber of the Royal Air Force. Inside the plane there are four of the seven crew members, who are preparing for take off before another night raid on Nazi Germany during World War II. Two pilots sit in the cockpit, while a navigator studies his maps, and in the foreground a flight sergeant turns a knob on the wireless device.

The painter, Laura Knight, developed a long and accurate investigation in order to create this work: she later stated that this painting had been the most difficult task she had done so far in the war. She worked in the RAF Mildenhall and lived in the WAAF Officers' Mess for several months while working on the painting. She was also given an obsolete Stirling for preparation. The final result of the work is flawless, because it depicts in a very faithful and detailed manner the moment of preparation for the take-off of the British crew, which is concentrating in their next mission. The realism of the painting gives it a very photographic feeling. The navigator of the scene, Raymond Frankish Escreet, would be killed in action and his mother received a reproduction of this picture as a memento.

References

1943 paintings
Paintings by Laura Knight
Paintings in the collection of the Imperial War Museum
Cultural history of World War II
United Kingdom home front during World War II
War paintings
Aviation art